Phinaea is a genus of plant in family Gesneriaceae. It contains the following species (but this list may be incomplete):
 Phinaea albolineata
 Phinaea divaricata (syn. Phinaea ecuadorana Wiehler)
 Phinaea multiflora

External links
 World Checklist of Gesneriaceae
 Phinaea from The Genera of Gesneriaceae

Gesnerioideae
Taxonomy articles created by Polbot
Gesneriaceae genera